Adolphe Dumas (18 December 1805 Chartreuse de Bon Pas, Vaucluse - 15 August 1861) was a French poet. Among his friends were Béranger, Alfred de Vigny, Victor Hugo, and Lamartine. He wrote Les Parisiennes (1830); La cité des hommes (1835); and Le camp des croisés (1838). Dumas became interested in the Provençal “renaissance,” and his poems, Un liame de rasin (1858), were written in the “langue d'oc.”

References

1805 births
1861 deaths
French male poets
19th-century French poets
19th-century French male writers